The Worcester Counts were a professional basketball franchise based in Worcester, Massachusetts in 1989. The team played its inaugural season in the World Basketball League before folding.  The Worcester Counts were one of numerous failed minor league franchises in Worcester, including the Bay State Bombardiers, a Continental Basketball League team that lasted only two seasons in Worcester.

Former Indiana University star Keith Smart, who hit the game winning shot for the Hoosiers in the 1987 NCAA Championship Game, played for the Counts during the 1989 season.

The Worcester Counts game program features the Counts logo and drawing of the Worcester Centrum.

The Counts played its home games at the Centrum in Worcester.

Sources
http://www.apbr.org/wbl88-92.html

References
http://www.worcestermag.com/city-desk/top-news/95549594.html?m=y&smobile=y

World Basketball League teams
1989 establishments in Massachusetts
1989 disestablishments in Massachusetts
Basketball teams established in 1989
Sports clubs disestablished in 1989
Basketball teams in Worcester, Massachusetts